Francisco José "Paco" López Fernández (born 19 September 1967) is a Spanish football manager and former player who played as a forward. He is the current manager of Granada CF.

In his playing career, he achieved Segunda División totals of 28 games and three goals for Hércules and Extremadura, but spent most of his years in Segunda División B in service of six clubs. 

As a manager, López worked mainly in the lower leagues, and spent 3 years in charge of Levante in La Liga.

Playing career
Born in Silla, Province of Valencia, López graduated from Valencia CF's youth setup. He made his senior debut with the reserves, in Tercera División.

In the summer of 1991, López joined Segunda División B club Hércules CF. After appearing regularly in the 1992–93 season, which ended in promotion, he played his first match as a professional on 19 September 1993, coming on as a second-half substitute in a 2–0 away loss against Real Burgos CF in the Segunda División.

López scored his first professional goal on 16 October 1993, his team's third in a 4–0 home win over Villarreal CF. In 1994, he moved to CF Extremadura also in the second tier.

After being sparingly played, López signed with division three side Levante UD in January 1995. In July, he moved to CD Castellón in the same league, and scored a career-best 16 goals in the 1997–98 campaign.

In 1998, López joined Real Murcia. At the end of the season, he dropped down to Tercera División and signed for Benidorm CF, eventually retiring at the age of 34.

Coaching career

López started working as a manager in 2004, with Villarreal's third team. In July 2008, after three full seasons at Catarroja CF, he signed with a club he had represented as a player, Benidorm.

On 16 July 2009, López was appointed at CD Alcoyano also in the third division. He was dismissed on 11 April 2011, after falling from first to fourth in only five matches.

López joined division two club FC Cartagena on 27 May 2011. He was relieved of his duties on 19 September, after failing to collect one single point in the first four games.

López returned to Mestalla on 24 October 2012, replacing the fired Sergio Ventosa. On 17 June of the following year, after narrowly avoiding relegation from the third tier, he left and returned to Villarreal C on 13 November.

On 22 May 2014, López was promoted to the reserves after the departure of Lluís Planagumà. On 22 June 2017, he moved to another reserve team, Atlético Levante UD also in the third division.

López was named manager of the main squad on 4 March 2018, following the sacking of Juan Ramón Muñiz. His first match in La Liga took place six days later, and he led his side to a 1–0 away win against Getafe CF.

López signed a one-year contract with an option for a further season on 8 May 2018, and five days later his team ended FC Barcelona's unbeaten league run by defeating the opposition 5–4 at home. In 2020–21, he led the Granotes to their first Copa del Rey semi-final after defeating Villarreal in the last minute of extra time; they lost that tie 3–2 on aggregate to Athletic Bilbao, again after extra time.

On 4 October 2021, López was fired, having earned only four points from as many draws at the start of the season. He had managed a club record 133 top-flight games, and had a lower losses percentage in the division than any other Levante manager bar Joaquín Caparrós.

On 9 November 2022, after more than a year of inactivity, López replaced Aitor Karanka at the helm of second-division side Granada CF.

Managerial statistics

References

External links

1967 births
Living people
People from Horta Sud
Sportspeople from the Province of Valencia
Spanish footballers
Footballers from the Valencian Community
Association football forwards
Segunda División players
Segunda División B players
Tercera División players
Valencia CF Mestalla footballers
Hércules CF players
CF Extremadura footballers
Levante UD footballers
CD Castellón footballers
Real Murcia players
Benidorm CF footballers
Spanish football managers
La Liga managers
Segunda División managers
Segunda División B managers
Tercera División managers
CD Alcoyano managers
FC Cartagena managers
Valencia CF Mestalla managers
Villarreal CF B managers
Atlético Levante UD managers
Levante UD managers
Granada CF managers